Točná is a village, and a cadastral subdivision of the municipal district of Prague 12.  There are 31 streets and 413 addresses registered, and a population of 679.

The village lies just north of Prague's southern border, formed by the Břežaný valley, south-west of Cholupice, north-west of the municipality of Dolní Břežany.  Between Točná and the Vltava river to the west is a protected forest.  A private airport is located within the northern part of the village limits, near the area called Nouzov.  The northern part of the village limits are bisected by Prague's Outer Ring Road, which then submerges into a tunnel just south of the airport.

Bus line 113 terminates in the village, and line 341 passes through it.

The village has a football pitch, home of the TJ Točná football club.  It also has a nursery school, one of the largest second-hand clothing stores in Prague, three automotive repair shops and a garden centre.  In 2014, a pub, Hospoda na Točné, opened on Branišovská street.

History 
From its formation in 1850, Komořany estate and surrounding buildings and greater part of Závist was part of the political municipality of Točná. All this locations has belonged together since the times when Komořany belonged the Zbraslav monastery. After World War II Komořany rise to village and became an independent municipality, detaching from Točná. Závist was also separated and newly belongs to Zbraslav. Starting in 1947, the local government of Modřany sought the transfer of the territory of Točná to Modřany. In 1960, the municipality of Točná was merged into the municipality of Cholupice. In 1974, Cholupice was joined to the Capital City of Prague. In 1976, the local government in Cholupice was dissolved, and both villages were attached to the local government in Modřany, which is now part of Prague 12. A remnant of the local committee system ("local national committee") in Točná is the street K výboru ("towards the committee"), which was named in 1974.

Protected Forest 
The hilly, forested area to the west of the village, bordered by the Břežaný creek, and the communities of Závist, Komořany and Nouzov, is a protected habitat.   The vague outlines of a Celtic oppidum are visible in the high area called Šance.  A large plaque commemorating the entomologist František Antonín Nickerl overlooks the Břežaný valley.  The forest's steep trails have, in recent years, become popular among mountain bikers.

The forest is bisected by the Branišovská switchback, which is limited to light vehicle traffic.  Despite traversing a protected area, the road has been used several times as part of a rally race from Zbraslav to Točná.

Community Events 
The village celebrates several annual events:
 January 6 - Three Kings - a charity collection drive organized by the Catholic church, in which donators are rewarded with a chalk inscription of 'K+M+B' (from the names of the Biblical Magi)) above a doorway or on a fencepost
 Lent - Carnival - a charity collection drive organized by the local football club, involving a costume parade
 Spring - Welcoming of Spring - a pageant put on by the local nursery school, culminating in the symbolic drowning of an effigy of winter
 Mid-June - St. Anthony's Fair - an all-day event featuring exhibitions, rides, contests and raffles, and live music, organized by the local community association
 Early September - Iron Kelt - a race uphill in the protected forest, 330m long with a rise of 40m
 November 11 - St. Martin's Day - St. Martin, a Roman soldier, arrives on a horse, and shares his cloak with a beggar; the gathered crowd then parades through the village behind St. Martin, chanting; the parade terminates in an open field, where poppy-seed pastries are handed out, and everyone is encouraged to share the pastry with another attendee, following the example of St. Martin 
 Advent - a pageant put on by the local nursery school, followed by the lighting of the village Christmas tree

Photo gallery

Famous Residents 
 Jiří Kodet - Czech actor
 Karel Vítězslav Mašek – Czech painter
 Jiří Tichota – Czech musician

References 

This article was initially translated from the Czech Wikipedia.

Districts of Prague